NYSE Arca, previously known as ArcaEx, an abbreviation of Archipelago Exchange, is an exchange on which both stocks and options are traded. It was owned by Intercontinental Exchange. It merged with the New York Stock Exchange in 2006 and now operates as a subsidiary of the NYSE Group, Inc. It is headquartered in Chicago.

Early reports indicated that NYSE Arca may have played a role in the 2010 Flash Crash.

History
In November 1994, Stuart Townsend and Gerald Putnam founded TerraNova Trading LLC, an electronic securities exchange, in Chicago. Its product, Archipelago, started accepting trading orders on January 20, 1997.

In 2005, Archipelago Holdings, the owner of ArcaEx, bought the Pacific Exchange, after what had been a close working relationship since 2001.

In 2006, ArcaEx merged with the New York Stock Exchange (NYSE) and the name was changed to NYSE Arca.

On August 22, 2013 the Arca system sent multiple sequences to Nasdaq which overloaded the Securities Information Processor (SIP) caused by reconnection issues to Nasdaq. This in turn caused a chain effect reaction which led to the NASDAQ flash freeze.

On Monday, March 20, 2017, the Arca platform stopped functioning due to a "system issue" and the exchange was unable to close trading for an undetermined number of funds.

See also
 List of stock exchanges
 List of stock exchanges in the Americas 
List of stock exchange mergers in the Americas

References

External links
 NYSE Arca Trading Information on NYSE.com
 NYSE to merge with Archipelago; NASDAQ to buy Instinet. Wikinews

Arca
Financial services companies established in 1994
Stock exchanges in the United States
Options exchanges in the United States
2006 mergers and acquisitions